A cystocele, also known as a prolapsed bladder, is a medical condition in which a woman's bladder bulges into her vagina. Some may have no symptoms. Others may have trouble starting urination, urinary incontinence, or frequent urination. Complications may include recurrent urinary tract infections and urinary retention. Cystocele and a prolapsed urethra often occur together and is called a cystourethrocele. Cystocele can negatively affect quality of life.

Causes include childbirth, constipation, chronic cough, heavy lifting, hysterectomy, genetics, and being overweight. The underlying mechanism involves weakening of muscles and connective tissue between the bladder and vagina. Diagnosis is often based on symptoms and examination.

If the cystocele causes few symptoms, avoiding heavy lifting or straining may be all that is recommended. In those with more significant symptoms a vaginal pessary, pelvic muscle exercises, or surgery may be recommended. The type of surgery typically done is known as a colporrhaphy. The condition becomes more common with age. About a third of women over the age of 50 are affected to some degree.

Signs and symptoms
The symptoms of a cystocele may include:
 a vaginal bulge
 the feeling that something is falling out of the vagina
 the sensation of pelvic heaviness or fullness
 difficulty starting a urine stream
 a feeling of incomplete urination
 frequent or urgent urination
 fecal incontinence
 frequent urinary tract infections
 back and pelvic pain
 fatigue
 painful sexual intercourse
 bleeding

A bladder that has dropped from its normal position and into the vagina can cause some forms of incontinence and incomplete emptying of the bladder.

Complications
Complications may include urinary retention, recurring urinary tract infections and incontinence. The anterior vaginal wall may actually protrude though the vaginal introitus (opening). This can interfere with sexual activity. Recurrent urinary tract infections are common for those who have urinary retention. In addition, though cystocele can be treated, some treatments may not alleviate troubling symptoms, and further treatment may need to be performed. Cystocele may affect the quality of life, women who have cystocele tend to avoid leaving their home and avoid social situations. The resulting incontinence puts women at risk of being placed in a nursing home or long-term care facility.

Cause 
A cystocele occurs when the muscles, fascia, tendons and connective tissues between a woman's bladder and vagina weaken, or detach. The type of cystocele that can develop can be due to one, two or three vaginal wall attachment failures: the midline defect, the paravaginal defect, and the transverse defect. The midline defect is a cystocele caused by the overstretching of the vaginal wall; the paravaginal defect is the separation of the vaginal connective tissue at the arcus tendineus fascia pelvis; the transverse defect is when the pubocervical fascia becomes detached from the top (apex) of the vagina. There is some pelvic prolapse in 40–60% of women who have given birth. Muscle injuries have been identified in women with cystocele. These injuries are more likely to occur in women who have given birth than those who have not. These muscular injuries result in less support to the anterior vaginal wall.

Some women with connective tissue disorders are predisposed to developing anterior vaginal wall collapse. Up to one third of women with Marfan syndrome have a history of vaginal wall collapse. Ehlers-Danlos syndrome in women is associated with a rate of 3 out of 4.

Risk factors 
Risk factors for developing a cystocele are:

 an occupation involving or history of heavy lifting
 pregnancy and childbirth
 chronic lung disease/smoking
 family history of cystocele
 exercising incorrectly
 ethnicity (risk is greater for Hispanic and whites)
 hypoestrogenism
 pelvic floor trauma
 connective tissue disorders
 spina bifida
 hysterectomy
 cancer treatment of pelvic organs
 childbirth; correlates to the number of births
 forceps delivery
 age
 chronically high intra-abdominal pressures
 chronic obstructive pulmonary disease
 constipation
 obesity

Connective tissue disorders predispose women to developing cystocele and other pelvic organ prolapse. The tissues tensile strength of the vaginal wall decreases when the structure of the collagen fibers change and become weaker.

Diagnosis 
There are two types of cystocele. The first is distension. This is thought to be due to the overstretching of the vaginal wall and is most often associated with aging, menopause and vaginal delivery. It can be observed when the rugae are less visible or even absent. The second type is displacement. Displacement is the detachment or abnormal elongation of supportive tissue.

The initial assessment of cystocele can include a pelvic exam to evaluate leakage of urine when the women is asked to bear down or give a strong cough (Valsalva maneuver), and the anterior vaginal wall measured and evaluated for the appearance of a cystocele. If a woman has difficulty emptying her bladder, the clinician may measure the amount of urine left in the woman's bladder after she urinates called the postvoid residual. This is measured by ultrasound. A voiding cystourethrogram is a test that involves taking x-rays of the bladder during urination. This x-ray shows the shape of the bladder and lets the doctor see any problems that might block the normal flow of urine. A urine culture and sensitivity test will assess the presence of a urinary tract infection that may be related to urinary retention. Other tests may be needed to find or rule out problems in other parts of the urinary system. Differential diagnosis will be improved by identifying possible inflammation of the Skene's glands and Bartholin glands.

Grading
A number of scales exist to grade the severity of a cystocele.

The pelvic organ prolapse quantification (POP-Q) assessment, developed in 1996, quantifies the descent of the cystocele into the vagina. The POP-Q provides reliable description of the support of the anterior, posterior and apical vaginal wall. It uses objective and precise measurements to the reference point, the hymen. Cystocele and prolapse of the vagina from other causes is staged using POP-Q criteria can range from good support (no descent into the vagina) reported as a POP-Q stage 0 or I to a POP-Q score of IV which includes prolapse beyond the hymen. It also used to quantifies the movement of other structures into the vaginal lumen and their descent.

The Baden–Walker Halfway Scoring System is used as the second most used system and assigns the classifications as mild (grade 1) when the bladder droops only a short way into the vagina; (grade 2) cystocele, the bladder sinks far enough to reach the opening of the vagina; and (grade 3) when the bladder bulges out through the opening of the vagina.

Classifications 
Cystocele can be further described as being apical, medial, lateral, or mediolateral.

Apical cystocele is located upper third of the vagina. The structures involved are the endopelvic fascia and ligaments. The cardinal ligaments and the uterosacral ligaments suspend the upper vaginal-dome. The cystocele in this region of the vagina is thought to be due to a cardinal ligament defect.

Medial cystocele forms in the mid-vagina and is related to a defect in the suspension provided by to a sagittal suspension system defect in the uterosacral ligaments and pubocervical fascia. The pubocervical fascia may thin or tear and create the cystocele. An aid in diagnosis is the creation of a 'shiny' spot on the epithelium of the vagina. This defect can be assessed by MRI.

Lateral cystocele forms when both the pelviperineal muscle and its ligamentous–fascial develop a defect. The ligamentous– fascial creates a 'hammock-like' suspension and support for the lateral sides of the vagina. Defects in this lateral support system results in a lack of bladder support. Cystocele that develops laterally is associated with an anatomic imbalance between anterior vaginal wall and the arcus tendineus fasciae pelvis – the essential ligament structure.

Prevention 
Cystocele may be mild enough not to result in symptoms that are troubling to a woman. In this case, steps to prevent it from worsening include:
 smoking cessation
 losing weight
 pelvic floor strengthening
 treatment of a chronic cough
 maintaining healthy bowel habits
 eating high fiber foods
 avoiding constipation and straining

Treatment
Treatment options range from no treatment for a mild cystocele to surgery for a more extensive cystocele. If a cystocele is not bothersome, the clinician may only recommend avoiding heavy lifting or straining that could cause the cystocele to worsen. If symptoms are moderately bothersome, the doctor may recommend a pessary, a device placed in the vagina to hold the bladder in place and to block protrusion. Treatment can consist of a combination of non-surgical and surgical management. Treatment choice is also related to age, desire to have children, severity of impairment, desire to continue sexual intercourse and other diseases that a woman may have.

Non-surgical
Cystocele is often treated by non-surgical means:
 Pessary – This is a removable device inserted into the vagina to support the anterior vaginal wall. Pessaries come in many different shapes and sizes. There are sometimes complications with the use of a pessary.
 Pelvic floor muscle therapy – Pelvic floor exercises to strengthen vaginal support can be of benefit. Specialized physical therapy can be prescribed to help strengthen the pelvic floor muscles.
 Dietary changes – Ingesting high fiber foods will aid in promoting bowel movements.
 Estrogen – intravaginal administration helps to prevent pelvic muscle atrophy

Surgery 
The surgery to repair the anterior vaginal wall may be combined with other procedures that will repair the other points of pelvic organ support such as anterior-posterior repair and anterior colporrhaphy. Treatment of cystocele often accompanies the more invasive hysterectomy. Since the failure rate in cystocele repair remains high, additional surgery may be needed. Women who have surgery to repair a cystocele have a 17% of needing another operation within the next ten years.

The surgical treatment of cystocele will depend on the cause of the defect and whether it occurs at the top (apex), middle, or lower part of the anterior vaginal wall. The type of surgery will also depend on the type of damage that exists between supporting structures and the vaginal wall. One of the most common surgical repairs is colporrhaphy. This surgical procedure consists of making a longitudinal folding of the vaginal tissue, suturing it into place and creating a stronger point of resistance to the intruding bladder wall. Surgical mesh is sometimes used to strengthen the anterior vaginal wall. It has a 10–50% failure rate. In some cases a surgeon may choose to use surgical mesh to strengthen the repair.

During surgery, the repair of the vaginal wall consists of folding over and then suturing the existing tissue between the vagina and bladder to strengthen it. This tightens the layers of tissue to promote the replacement of the pelvic organs into their normal place. The surgery also provides more support for the bladder. This surgery is done by a surgeon specializing in gynecology and is performed in a hospital. Anesthesia varies according to the needs of each woman. Recovery may take four to six weeks. Other surgical treatment may be performed to treat cystocele. Support for the vaginal wall is accomplished with the paravaginal defect repair. This is a surgery, usually laproscopic, that is done to the ligaments and fascia through the abdomen. The lateral ligaments and supportive structures are repaired, sometimes shortened to provide additional support to the vaginal wall.

Sacrocolpopexy is a procedure that stabilizes the vaginal vault (the uppermost portion of the vagina) and is often chosen as the treatment for cystocele, especially if previous surgeries were not successful. The procedure consists of attaching the vaginal vault to the sacrum. It has a success rate of 90%. Some women choose not to have surgery to close the vagina. This surgery, called colpocleisis, treats cystocele by closing the vaginal opening. This can be an option for women who no longer want to have vaginal intercourse.

If an enterocele/sigmoidocele, or prolapse of the rectum/colon, is also present, the surgical treatment will take this concurrent condition into account while planning and performing the repairs. Estrogen that is administered vaginally before surgical repair can strengthen the vaginal tissue providing a more successful outcome when mesh or sutures are used for the repair. Vaginal thickness increases after estrogen therapy. Another review on the surgical management of cystocele describes a more successful treatment that more strongly attaches the ligaments and fascia to the vagina to lift and stabilize it.

Post surgical complications can develop. The complications following surgical treatment of cystocele are:

 side effects or reactions to anesthesia
 bleeding
 infection
 painful intercourse
 Urinary incontinence
 constipation
 bladder injuries
 urethral injuries
 urinary tract infection.
 vaginal erosion due to mesh

After surgery, a woman is instructed to restrict her activities and monitor herself for signs of infection such as an elevated temperature, discharge with a foul odor and consistent pain. Clinicians may recommend that sneezing, coughing, and constipation are to be avoided. Splinting the abdomen while coughing provides support to an incised area and decreases pain on coughing. This is accomplished by applying gentle pressure to the surgical site for bracing during a cough.

Recurrent surgery on the pelvic organs may not be due to a failure of the surgery to correct the cystocele. Subsequent surgeries can be directly or indirectly relating to the primary surgery. Prolapse can occur at a different site in the vagina. Further surgery after the initial repair can be to treat complications of mesh displacement, pain, or bleeding. Further surgery may be needed to treat incontinence.

One goal of surgical treatment is to restore the vagina and other pelvic organs to their anatomically normal positions. This may not be the outcome that is most important to the woman being treated who may only want relief of symptoms and an improvement in her quality of life. The International Urogynecological Association (IUGA) has recommended that the data collected regarding the success of cystocele and pelvic organ repairs include the presence or absence of symptoms, satisfaction and Quality of Life. Other measures of a successful outcome should include perioperative data, such as operative time and hospital stay. Standardized Healthcare Quality of Life should be part of the measure of a successful resolution of cystocele. Data regarding short- and long-term complications is included in the recommendations of the IUGA to better assess the risk–benefit ratio of each procedure. Current investigations into the superiority of using biological grafting versus native tissue or surgical mesh indicates that using grafts provides better results.

Epidemiology 
A large study found a rate of 29% over the lifetime of a woman. Other studies indicate a recurrence rate as low as 3%.

In the US, greater than 200,000 surgeries are performed each year for pelvic organ prolapse and 81% of these are to correct cystocele. Cystocele occurs most frequently compared to the prolapse of other pelvic organs and structure. Cystocele is found to be three times as common as vaginal vault prolapse and twice as often as posterior vaginal wall defects. The incidence of cystocele is around 9 per 100 women-years. The highest incidence of symptoms occurs between ages of 70 and 79 years. Based on population growth statistics, the number of women with prolapse will increase by a minimum of 46% by the year 2050 in the US. Surgery to correct prolapse after hysterectomy is 3.6 per 1,000 women-years.

History 

Notable is the mention of cystocele in many older cultures and locations. In 1500 B.C. Egyptians wrote about the "falling of the womb". In 400 B.C. a Greek physician documented his observations and treatments:

"After the patient had been tied to a ladder-like frame, she was tipped upward so that her head was toward the bottom of the frame. The frame was then moved upward and downward more or less rapidly for approximately 3–5 min. As the patient was in an inverted position, it was thought that the prolapsing organs of the genital tract would be returned to their normal position by the force of gravity and the shaking motion."

Hippocrates had his own theories regarding the cause of prolapse. He thought that recent childbirth, wet feet, 'sexual excesses', exertion, and fatigue may have contributed to the condition. Polybus, Hippocrates's son-in-law, wrote: "a prolapsed uterus was treated by using local astringent lotions, a natural sponge packed into the vagina, or placement of half a pomegranate in the vagina." In 350 A.D., another practitioner named Soranus described his treatments which stated that the pomegranate should be dipped into vinegar before insertion. Success could be enhanced if the woman was on bed rest and reduced intake of fluid and food. If the treatment was still not successful, the woman's legs were tied together for three days.

In 1521, Berengario da Carpi performed the first surgical treatment for prolapse. This was to tie a rope around the prolapse, tighten it for two days until it was no longer viable and cut it off. Wine, aloe, and honey were then applied to the stump.

In the 1700s, a Swiss gynecologist, Peyer, published a description of a cystocele. He was able to describe and document both cystocele and uterine prolapse. In 1730, Halder associated cystocele with childbirth. During this same time, efforts began to standardize the terminology that is still familiar today. In the 1800s, the surgical advancements of anesthesia, suturing, suturing materials and acceptance of Joseph Lister's theories of antisepsis improved outcomes for women with cystocele. The first surgical techniques were practiced on female cadavers. In 1823, Geradin proposed that an incision and resection may provide treatment. In 1830, the first dissection of the vagina was performed by Dieffenbach on a living woman. In 1834, Mendé proposed that dissecting and repair of the edges of the tissues could be done. In 1859, Huguier proposed the amputation of the cervix was going to solve the problem for elongation.

In 1866, a method of correcting a cystocele was proposed that resembled current procedures. Sim subsequently developed another procedure that did not require the full-thickness dissection of the vaginal wall. In 1888, another method of treating anterior vaginal wall Manchester combined an anterior vaginal wall repair with an amputation of the cervix and a perineorrhaphy. In 1909, White noted the high rate of recurrence of cystocele repair. At this time it was proposed that reattaching the vagina to support structures was more successful and resulted in less recurrence. This same proposal was proposed again in 1976 but further studies indicated that the recurrence rate was not better.

In 1888, treatments were tried that entered the abdomen to make reattachments. Some did not agree with this and suggested an approach through the inguinal canal. In 1898, further abdominal approaches were proposed. No further advances have been noted until 1961 when reattachment of the anterior vaginal wall to Cooper's ligament began to be used. Unfortunately, posterior vaginal wall prolapse occurred in some patients even though the anterior repair was successful.

In 1955, using mesh to support pelvic structures came into use. In 1970, tissue from pigs began to be used to strengthen the anterior vaginal wall in surgery. Beginning in 1976, improvement in suturing began along with the surgical removal of the vagina being used to treat prolapse of the bladder. In 1991, assumptions about the detailed anatomy of the pelvic support structures began to be questioned regarding the existence of some pelvic structures and the non-existence of others. More recently, the use of stem cells, robot-assisted laparoscopic surgery are being used to treat cystocele.

See also 
 Hysterectomy
 Fecal incontinence
 Sigmoidocele
 Urethropexy

References

Further reading
 Using splinting to support and diminish pain while coughing, Craven and Hirnle's Fundamentals of Nursing: Human Health and Function, 6th edition

External links 
 Cystocele, Pelvic Organ Prolapse

Noninflammatory disorders of female genital tract
Vagina
Wikipedia medicine articles ready to translate
Women's health
Urology
Incontinence
Gynecological surgery
Reproductive system
Oncology
Urinary bladder disorders
Urinary incontinence
Urinary system
Surgery